The 1920 All-Ireland Senior Football Championship Final was the 33rd All-Ireland Final and the deciding match of the 1920 All-Ireland Senior Football Championship, an inter-county Gaelic football tournament for the top teams in Ireland.

Pre-match
The final was the first time the teams had met since Bloody Sunday (21 November 1920); since then, the Anglo-Irish Treaty had been signed and 26 counties had been offered independence from British rule.

Match summary
IRA volunteer Dan Breen, who previously fought against the British Empire during the War of Independence, threw the ball in at kickoff. The Civil War would begin just 17 days after.

Dublin were held scoreless in the second half, they had led by 1-2 to 0-3 at half-time. A late goal by Tommy Powell sealed victory for Tipperary.

It was Tipperary's fourth All-Ireland football title following success in 1889, 1895 and 1900. Football has since become the secondary GAA sport in the county, with hurling now being more prominent.

Details

Linesmen:

Sideline Official

References

All-Ireland Senior Football Championship Final
All-Ireland Senior Football Championship Final, 1920
All-Ireland Senior Football Championship Finals
Dublin county football team matches
Tipperary county football team matches